This article presents the discography of the French singer Mireille Mathieu.

Albums

Singles 
1966 – C'est ton nom
1966 – Un homme et une femme
1966 – Paris en colère
1966 – Qu'elle est belle
1966 – Mireille Mathieu
1966 – Qu'elle est belle
1966 – Celui que j'aime
1966 – Mon credo
1967 – Adieu à la nuit
1967 – La dernière valse
1967 – Quand tu t'en iras
1967 – Quand on revient
1967 – Nous on s'aimera
1967 – Un monde avec toi
1968 – Ensemble
1968 – Sweet souvenirs of Stefan
1968 – El último vals
1968 – Quand fera-t-il jour camarade
1968 – Una canzone
1968 – Mon credo
1968 – L'amour est passé
1968 – Quand fera-t-il jour camarade
1969 – Hinter den Kulissen von Paris
1969 – La première étoile
1969 – Une simple lettre
1969 – Mon bel amour d'éte
1969 – La première étoile
1969 – Tarata-ting, tarata-tong
1969 – Toi, moi, nous
1970 – An einem Sonntag in Avignon
1970 – Scusami se
1970 – Es geht mir gut, cheri
1970 – Das Wunder aller Wunder ist die Liebe
1970 – Donne ton cœur, donne ta vie
1970 – C'est dommage
1970 – Mon amour me revient
1970 – Ganz Paris ist ein Theater
1971 – Pardonne-moi ce caprice d'enfant
1971 – Une histoire d'amour
1971 – Mille fois bravo
1971 – Le casse
1971 – Der pariser Tango
1971 – Akropolis adieu
1971 – Liebe kennt nur der, der sie verloren hat
1971 – Regen ist schön
1971 – Meine Welt ist die Musik
1971 – Nimm noch einmal die Gitarre
1971 – Die Kinder von Montparnasse
1972 – Quando verranno i giorni
1972 – J'étais si jeune
1972 – Corsica
1972 – Un jour tu reviendras
1972 – Und der Wind wird ewig singen
1972 – Roma, Roma, Roma
1972 – Hans im Glück
1972 – Korsika
1972 – En frappant dans nos mains
1973 – La paloma, adieu
1973 – Paris perdu
1973 – Emmène-moi demain avec toi
1975 – Apprends-moi
1975 – On ne vit pas sans se dire adieu
1975 – Tarata-ting, tarata-tong
1975 – Addio
1975 – Paris vor hundert Jahren
1975 – Inutile de nous revoir
1975 – La marche de sacco et vanzetti
1975 – Aloa-he
1975 – Der Zar und das Mädchen
1976 – Aber heidschi bumbeidschi
1976 – La vie en rose
1976 – Ciao bambino, sorry
1976 – Ma mélodie d'amour
1976 – Der wein war aus Bordeaux
1976 – Kleine Schwalbe
1977 – Mille colombes
1978 – Santa Maria de la mer
1978 – A blue bayou
1978 – Alle Kinder dieser Erde
1978 – Chante pour le soleil
1979 – Mireille Mathieu chante Noël
1979 – Un enfant viendra
1979 – Zuhause wartet Natascha
1979 – Un enfant viendra
1980 – Une femme amoureuse
1980 – Chicano
1980 – Les pianos du Paradis
1980 – Tage wie aus Glas
1980 – Mamy oh mamy
1981 – Mireille Mathieu
1981 – Bravo tu as gagné
1981 – Du mußt mir gar nichts von Liebe sagen
1981 – Die liebe einer Frau
1981 – Une vie d'amour
1981 – Promets-moi
1982 – Die liebe zu dir
1982 – Vai Colomba Bianca
1983 – Together We're Strong (with Patrick Duffy)
1983 – Eternellement amoureuse
1983 – Nur für dich
1984 – Good bye my love
1984 – Mon amour
1984 – Zurück zur Zärtlichkeit
1984 – On est bien
1985 – Ich schau' in deine Augen
1985 – Don't talk to me of love
1986 – Du weißt doch, ich lieb dich
1986 – Lieben heißt für mich, mit dir zu leben
1987 – Rencontres de femmes
1987 – Nie war mein Herz dabei
1988 – L'enfant que je n'ai jamais eu
1989 – L'américain
1993 – Schau mich bitte nicht so an
1996 – In meinem Traum
1996 – Feuer im Blut
2002 – Aujourd'hui je reviens

External links
Mathieu discography at Discogs.com
Mathieu discography at Allmusic.com

Discographies of French artists
Pop music discographies